Theodore Newton (August 4, 1904 – February 28, 1963) was an American movie and  stage actor. He was sometimes billed as Ted Newton.

Early years 
Newton was born in Lawrenceville, New Jersey. His parents were Mr. and Mrs. C. Bertram Newton.

He failed out of Princeton University after  years and worked as a bank clerk in Philadelphia. In the evenings, he began acting with the Hedgerow Theatre.

Career
Newton's Broadway credits included (billed as "Ted Newton") The Royal Family (1950), The Lady from the Sea (1950), The Big Knife (1949), Apology (1943), My Sister Eileen (1940), Suzanna and the Elders (1940), The Man Who Came to Dinner (1939), Wise Tomorrow (1937), Dead End (1935), Vermont (1928) and Elmer the Great (1928).

In 1933, Newton made his first film appearance, and he eventually acted in almost 30 films.

Personal life
On November 22, 1936, Newton married actress Drina Hill. They divorced, and on May 9, 1949, he married actress Emily Lawrence in Newtown, Pennsylvania.

Death 
Newton died of cancer in Hollywood, California at age 58.

Partial filmography

 Central Airport (1933) - Radio Operator (uncredited)
 The Working Man (1933) - Tommy Hartland
 The Sphinx (1933) - Jack Burton
 Voltaire (1933) - Francois
 Ace of Aces (1933) - Lt. Foster 'Froggy' Kelley
 From Headquarters (1933) - Jack Winton
 The World Changes (1933) - Paul Nordholm
 Heat Lightning (1934) - Steve Laird
 A Modern Hero (1934) - Elmer Croy
 Upper World (1934) - Reporter Rocklen
 Now I'll Tell (1934) - Joe
 Let's Try Again (1934) - Paul Milburn
 Blind Date (1934) - Tom (uncredited)
 Gambling (1934) - Ray Braddock
 Jalna (1935) - Piers Whiteoak
 The Hidden Eye (1945) - Gibbs - Chauffeur
 What Next, Corporal Hargrove? (1945) - Capt. Parkson
 Miss Susie Slagle's (1946) - Dr. Boyd
 From This Day Forward (1946) - Mr. Brewer (uncredited)
 Two Years Before the Mast (1946) - Hayes
 The Come On (1956) - Detective Capt. Getz
 The Proud and Profane (1956) - Bob Kilpatrick
 Somebody Up There Likes Me (1956) - Athletic Commissioner Edward Eagan
 Friendly Persuasion (1956) - Major Harvey
 The Saga of Hemp Brown (1958) - John Murphy (uncredited)
 The Story on Page One (1959) - Dr. Kemper (uncredited)
 Dime with a Halo (1963) - Consul Glenson (final film role)

References

External links
 
 

1904 births
1963 deaths
20th-century American male actors
American male film actors
People from Lawrence Township, Mercer County, New Jersey
Male actors from New Jersey
Deaths from cancer in California
American male stage actors
Princeton University alumni